Tanner Row is a street in the city centre of York, in England.

History
The area covered by the street was part of the civilian settlement associated with Roman Eboracum. Archaeological investigations have uncovered remains of a bathhouse, and a house, and two mosaic pavements.

The street originated in the Mediaeval period as part of North Street, running along the back of the plots of the buildings on the north side of Micklegate. The street gradually became built up with warehouses, coach houses, stables. An increasing number of the Micklegate plots were divided, with new houses constructed on the street.

By the late Middle Ages, the street was associated with tanners, and in 1524 it was recorded as "Barker Rawe". In 1700, Lady Hewley's Almshouses were built on the street, surviving until they were demolished for the construction of the city's first railway station.

Layout and architecture

The street runs south-west, from the junction of North Street and Wellington Row, near south bank of the River Ouse, to the junction of Toft Green and Barker Lane. Approximately halfway, it crosses the junction of George Hudson Street and Rougier Street. Station Rise leads off the north-west side of the road, as does the short Tanner Street.

Notable buildings on the south-east side of the street are the late-15th century 1 Tanner Row; the early-18th century 7 Tanner Row; the Old Rectory, built as a warehouse in about 1600; the Corner Pin, built in the mid-18th century; 19 and 21 Tanner Row, built in 1899 for the York Equitable Industrial Society; 37, and 39 Tanner Row, both built about 1850, and 43 Tanner Row, built as a workshop in the 1840s.  On the north side lie the side of the Aviva Building; former York railway station, now the headquarters of the City of York Council; and the Grand Hotel and Spa.

References

Streets in York